Jack Alexander Draper (born 22 December 2001) is a British professional tennis player. He has been ranked as high as world No. 38 in singles by the ATP, which he achieved on 16 January 2023, and he also attained a career-high doubles ranking of world No. 477 on 14 February 2022. Draper has won seven titles on the International Tennis Federation (ITF) Men's World Tennis Tour, and four on the ATP Challenger Tour.

As a junior, Draper was the runner-up in his first and only Grand Slam final at the 2018 Wimbledon Championships, and he closed the year at a career-high junior ranking of No. 7.

Early life 
Draper was born in Sutton, London and brought up in nearby Ashtead. His father is Roger Draper, former chief executive of Sport England and the Lawn Tennis Association and his mother is Nicky Draper, a former junior British Tennis Champion. Draper attended Parkside School in Stoke d’Abernon, Cobham, from age four to eleven, whilst being coached by Justin Sherring. He then attended Reed's School, Cobham for two years.

Juniors
Draper reached his first and only junior Grand Slam final at the 2018 Wimbledon Championships, where he lost to Tseng Chun-hsin in three sets. He closed the year at a career-high junior ranking of No. 7.

Professional career

2021: ATP, Masters and top 250 debut
Draper made his ATP Tour main draw debut in singles as a wildcard at the Miami Open, but had to retire in his first-round match against Mikhail Kukushkin, after he collapsed on the court from heat-related illness.

At the Queen's Club Championships in June, Draper secured the biggest win of his career to date with a victory over world No. 23 Jannik Sinner as a wildcard. He defeated world No. 39 Alexander Bublik in the round of 16 to reach the quarterfinals of an ATP tournament for the first time in his career, where he lost to eventual finalist Cameron Norrie. By reaching this stage of the tournament, he became the youngest British ATP quarterfinalist since Andy Murray in 2006 and earned a top 250 debut in the ATP rankings.

He received a wildcard into the singles main draw at the Wimbledon Championships. He drew defending champion Novak Djokovic in the first round, where he claimed the first set 6–4 before losing the next three sets to cede the match.

2022: Four Challengers, ATP semis & Masters quarters & top-10 win, top 50
In January, Draper entered the 2022 Città di Forlì II, an ATP Challenger Tour event, in Forlì, where he was the eighth seed. There, he reached his first Challenger final and won his first title on the tour after defeating compatriot Jay Clarke, 6–3, 6–0. Two weeks later, Draper continued his run of form at the Città di Forlì IV, where he was unseeded and reached his second final to claim his second Challenger title after defeating Tim van Rijthoven, 6–1, 6–2. The win led Draper to debut in the top 200 and reach a new career high of world No. 162. Draper secured his third consecutive Challenger title in his third Forlì tournament at Città di Forlì V the following week after saving four match points in the final to defeat Alexander Ritschard in three sets. 

At the Miami Open Draper clinched his first Masters 1000 match win over Gilles Simon as a wildcard. He lost in the second round to Norrie. Draper went on the next week to win his fourth Challenger title at Saint-Brieuc, defeating Zizou Bergs in the final.
At the 2022 Mutua Madrid Open on his debut he defeated World No. 27 Lorenzo Sonego as a wildcard for his second win at the Masters level. Draper made his top 100 debut at world no. 99 on 13 June 2022.

At Eastbourne, as a wildcard, Draper beat Jenson Brooksby, 4th seed Diego Schwartzman and fellow wildcard Ryan Peniston to reach the first ATP semifinal of his career. He lost in three sets to Maxime Cressy in the semifinals. He earned a direct entry at a major tournament for the first time at the 2022 Wimbledon Championships and won his first Grand Slam match defeating wildcard Zizou Bergs.

Draper qualified for the Canadian Open in Montreal, where, after beating Hugo Gaston in the first round, upset third seed and world no. 5 Stefanos Tsitsipas in straight sets in the second round for his first top-10 win. It was his first third-round showing in his career at a Masters 1000 level. After Gaël Monfils, his third-round opponent, retired due to injury, Draper advanced to his first Masters 1000 quarterfinal. He lost to Pablo Carreño Busta in straight sets.

At the 2022 Winston-Salem Open he defeated Fabio Fognini in the second round. Next he defeated former No. 3 and wildcard Dominic Thiem to reach the quarterfinals, where he lost to qualifier Marc-Andrea Hüsler in straight sets. At the US Open he reached the third round of a Major for the first time in his career defeating sixth seed and world no. 8 Felix Auger-Aliassime in straight sets. Auger-Aliassime made 41 unforced errors compared to just 17 by Draper.

On 19 October, he qualified for the 2022 Next Generation ATP Finals, the first Briton to do so. On 24 October he reached his career-high singles ranking of World No. 45 having reached the top 50 two weeks earlier. At the NextGen Finals he reached the semifinals defeating the top seed Lorenzo Musetti.

2023: Top 40 and Australian Open debut
He reached the top 40 on 9 January 2023.

Singles performance timeline 

Current through the 2023 Indian Wells Masters.

ATP Challenger and ITF Futures finals

Singles: 14 (11 titles, 3 runner–ups)

Doubles: 2 (1 title, 1 runner–up)

Junior Grand Slam tournament finals

Singles: 1 (1 runner-up)

Record against top 10 players
Draper's record against players who have been ranked in the top 10, with those who are active in boldface. Only ATP Tour main draw matches are considered:

Top 10 wins
He has a  record against players who were, at the time the match was played, ranked in the top 10.

References

External links

LTA profile

2001 births
Living people
British male tennis players
People from Sutton, London
Tennis people from Greater London
People educated at Reed's School
People educated at Parkside School, Cobham
English male tennis players